Gordon Lee may refer to:

Gordon Lee (comic store owner) (1958–2013), American comic book store owner charged with distributing obscene materials
Gordon Lee (congressman) (1859–1927), U.S. congressman from Georgia
Gordon Lee (footballer) (1934–2022), English football player and manager
Gordon de Lisle Lee (1863–1927), British heraldry expert
Gordon William Lee (1894–1964), former Alberta politician

See also
Lee Gordon (disambiguation)